Ophrah, ( or ) is a name in the Hebrew Bible meaning "a fawn" given to: 
 A city of Benjamin, probably identical with Ephron and Ephraim, the modern Palestinian city of Taybeh. The Israeli settlement of Ofra is close to the site as well. According to Epiphanius, it was situated 5 miles east of the city of Bethel.
 "Ophrah of the Abi-ezrites," a city of Manasseh, 6 miles (10 km) southwest of Shechem, the residence of Gideon. After his great victory over the Midianites, he slew at this place the captive kings. He then assumed the function of high priest and sought to make Ophrah what Shiloh should have been. This thing "became a snare" to Gideon and his house. After Gideon's death, his family resided here until they were put to death by Gideon's son Abimelech. It is identified with Ferata.

References

 

Hebrew Bible cities
Former populated places in Southwest Asia